Kim Jeong-cheol (born 20 March 1957) is a South Korean boxer. He competed in the men's flyweight event at the 1976 Summer Olympics.

References

1957 births
Living people
South Korean male boxers
Olympic boxers of South Korea
Boxers at the 1976 Summer Olympics
Place of birth missing (living people)
Flyweight boxers